Phenol extraction may refer to the process of extracting and isolating phenols from raw materials, such as coal tar. These purified phenols are used in many industrial and medical compounds and are used as precursors in some synthesis reactions. 

Phenol extraction may also refer to a laboratory procedure to purify nucleic acid samples using a phenol solution.

Nucleic Acid Extraction with Phenol 

A mixture of tris-ethylenediaminetetraacetic acid (TE) and phenol is combined with an equal volume of an aqueous DNA and RNA sample. After agitation and centrifugal separation, the aqueous layer is isolated and extracted with ether. The DNA is then concentrated by ethanol precipitation.

The phenol extraction technique is often used to purify raw samples of nucleic acids taken from cells. To obtain nucleic acid samples, the cell must be lysed and the nucleic acids separated from all other cell materials. Phenol is a useful compound for breaking down superfluous cell materials that would otherwise contaminate the nucleic acid sample.

Phenol is nonpolar and has a higher density than water (1.07 g/cm3 compared to water’s 1.00 g/cm3). In a water-phenol solution, denatured proteins and other unwanted cell components will be dissolved in the phenol, while the polar nucleic acids will be dissolved in the water. The solution can then be centrifuged to separate the phenol and water into distinct organic and aqueous phases. The aqueous phase, containing the purified nucleic acids, can then be extracted.

Phenol is often used in combination with chloroform. Adding chloroform along with phenol ensures a clear separation between the aqueous and organic phases. Chloroform and phenol are miscible and mix to form a denser solution than phenol alone, therefore making the organic and aqueous layers more likely to separate and form distinct phases. There is also less cross-contamination from the organic phase into the aqueous phase. This is useful when the aqueous phase is being removed from the solution to obtain a pure nucleic acid sample.

For phenol extraction to be effective, the pH of the solution must be adjusted according to what is being extracted. In the case of DNA  purification, a pH of 7.0–8.0 is used. If an experiment aims to obtain samples of purified RNA, a pH of around 4.5 is used. Due to the negative charge on the backbone of DNA from the attached phosphate groups decreasing the pH of a solution will lead to neutralization. At pH 4.5, hydrogen ions neutralize the negative charges on the phosphate groups, and cause the DNA to dissolve in the organic phase, allowing RNA to be isolated by itself in the aqueous phase.

See also
Phenol-chloroform extraction

References

External links
Physiology.med.cornell.edu
Wisegeek.com

Molecular biology